Vadim Ivanov (born 8 October 1968) is a Soviet athlete. He competed in the men's long jump at the 1992 Summer Olympics.

References

1968 births
Living people
Athletes (track and field) at the 1992 Summer Olympics
Soviet male long jumpers
Olympic athletes of the Unified Team
Place of birth missing (living people)